Tito Schipa (born Raffaele Attilio Amedeo Schipa; 2 January 1889 in Lecce16 December 1965) was an Italian lyric tenor, considered the greatest tenore di grazia and one of the most popular tenors of the century.

Biography

Schipa was born as Raffaele Attilio Amedeo Schipa on 27 December 1888 in Lecce in Apulia into an Arbëreshë family; his birthday was recorded as January 2, 1889 for military conscription purposes. He studied in Milan and made his operatic debut at age 21 in 1910 at Vercelli. He subsequently appeared throughout Italy and in Buenos Aires, Argentina. In 1917, he created the role of Ruggiero in Puccini's La rondine.

In 1919, Schipa traveled to the United States, joining the Chicago Opera Company. He remained with the Chicago company until 1932, whereupon he appeared at the New York Metropolitan Opera from 1932 to 1935, and again in 1941. He also sang at the San Francisco Opera, beginning in 1924.

From 1929 to 1949 he performed regularly in Italy, including at La Scala, Milan and the Rome Opera. He returned to Buenos Aires to sing in 1954. In 1957, he toured the Soviet Union.

Schipa's artistry is preserved on film. In 1929, he appeared in two Vitaphone movie shorts, singing "M'appari" from Flotow's opera Martha and "Una furtiva lagrima" from Donizetti's L'elisir d'amore.

Schipa's stage repertoire, which in his early career had encompassed a wide range of Verdi and Puccini roles, eventually contracted to about 20 congenial Italian and French operatic roles, including Massenet's Werther, Donizetti's L'elisir d'amore and Cilea's L'arlesiana. In concert, Schipa performed a preferred array of lyrical operatic arias and songs, including Neapolitan and Spanish popular songs.

Schipa made numerous recordings of arias and songs during his career, beginning in Italy in 1913. His recorded output included a famous 78-rpm set of Donizetti's Don Pasquale, made in 1932. This is still available on CD. He also recorded several tangos, some of which were composed by him in Spanish, mostly in Buenos Aires and New York. Thanks to his early Latin American tours, Schipa was a very popular tenor in Latin America.

Like his contemporary Richard Tauber, Tito Schipa was also a conductor.  Although a few contemporary critics considered Schipa's voice to be small in size, restricted in range and slightly husky in timbre, he was still extremely popular with the public.  Michael Scott (The Record of Singing: 1978), while admiring Schipa's charm and taste, points out that it is not correct to say that Schipa was a master of bel canto; indeed Scott and others regard Schipa's recording of "Il mio tesoro" from Mozart's Don Giovanni as one of the worst ever made, with sloppy runs and sketchy ornamentation.

Yet his performance of the entire aria during a Metropolitan Opera broadcast of Don Giovanni on January 20, 1934, as well as surviving fragments from a “live” New Orleans performance of the opera in 1935, show him in superb form.  "Although the quality of one or two of Mr. Schipa's top notes was rather tenuous," New York critic Francis D. Perkins wrote in the Herald Tribune in January 1934, “the style and phrasing of his aria was usually artistic and well schooled.”

On July 18, 1919, he was initiated to the Scottish Rite Freemasonry in the Lodge Espartana of Buenos Aires. In 1939, Tito Schipa declined an invitation from Italian-American groups to perform 12 concerts in order to raise money for the Anti-Fascist movement in Italy. Although he was offered $1,000 for each appearance, Schipa refused and is quoted in his letter, dated February 23, 1939, "I am sorry that I cannot sing for Loubet; but you MUST understand my situation; and my relationship with Achille Starace in Italy and all authorities there. And you know the purpose of the benefit for which Loubet asks me to sing for. Not tell anybody the reason; tell that I cannot come to New York or some other excuse; but don't ask me the impossible".

Schipa sang his final performance at the Metropolitan Opera in 1941 before returning to Fascist Italy, "where he was a pet of the Benito Mussolini regime", an association he would never really live down; after returning to the United States, his first post war concert was poorly attended. In 1958, Schipa retired from the operatic stage to teach voice, initially in Budapest. He returned to New York for one last concert performance in 1962; Town Hall was full to overflowing. Schipa died of complications from diabetes on December 16, 1965 at the age of 77 in Manhattan, New York City, while teaching there.

Legacy
He was a National Patron of Delta Omicron, an international professional music fraternity.

His son Tito Schipa Jr. is a composer, singer-songwriter, producer, writer and actor.

Selected filmography
 Three Lucky Fools (1933)
 To Live (1937)
 Mad About Opera (1948)
 The Mysteries of Venice (1951)

Bibliography

 Enzo Ferrieri, I "Piccoli" di Hollywood, in Comœdia, Anno XVI, giugno 1934
 Renzo D'Andrea, Tito Schipa, Schena Editore, Fasano 1980.
 Tito Schipa Jr., Tito Schipa nella vita e nell'arte, Argo, Lecce 1993, 2008
 Gianni Carluccio, Tito Schipa, un leccese nel mondo, San Cesario, 2007
 Carlo Stasi, Dizionario Enciclopedico dei Salentini, Grifo, Lecce 2018, Vol. II, pp. 974–976

References
Tito Schipa (Opera Vivra.com) - Opera Vivràs biography on Schipa.

External links

TitoSchipa.it - English version of the Italian site run by the Schipa family.
.
 - A 1929 video of Schipa singing the aria "Una furtiva lagrima" from Gaetano Donizetti's L'elisir d'amore.
 Tito Schipa Sings Opera (1913) - Single sound recording of Tito Schipa with orchestra  singing arias from Cacvlleria Rusticana, La Boheme, La giaconda, Lucia di Lammemoor, Rigoletto and Tosca on Archive.org 
  Tito Schipa's single sound recordings with orchestra singing several popular songs including: A Cuba, A la Orilla de un Palmar, Amapola, Chi se nne scorda cchiu, El Gaucho, Granadinas, Jota, Napulitanata,Nina,  Oh! Dulce Misterio de la Vida, Palgliacci - Serenata d'arlecchino, Pesca d'ammore,  Princesita, Quiereme Mucho, Santa Lucía, Son Tutta Duolo, Traviata - Un Di Felice on Archive.org
 History of the Tenor / Tito Schipa / Sound Clips and Narration
Илка Попова. Встречи на оперной сцене. Тито Скипа . (стр.116-123). Электронная версия, исправленная и дополненная (пер. с болг. М. Малькова). Спб.2013.(In Russian).
 Tito Schipa recordings at the Discography of American Historical Recordings.

1880s births
1965 deaths
People from Lecce
Italian operatic tenors
Italian people of Arbëreshë descent
20th-century Italian male opera singers
Victor Records artists